The Martyrs of Gorkum were a group of 19 Dutch Catholic clerics, secular and religious,  who were hanged on 9 July 1572 in the town of Brielle by militant Dutch Calvinists during the 16th-century religious wars—specifically, the Dutch Revolt against Spanish rule, which developed into the Eighty Years' War.

Events
In the first half of the 16th century, various forms of Protestantism—particularly, Lutheranism and Calvinism—were spreading through Western Europe. In the Low Countries, then under the rule of Spain, Emperor Charles V and his son King  Philip II instituted a systematic campaign to root out the new religious movements, which resulted in political resentment towards the authorities, including the Catholic Church. Inhabitants of the northern Netherlands who were primarily Protestant began to turn against the Catholic priests and monastics present.

By 1572 the Netherlands were in open revolt against Spanish rule, while in the internal rivalry among the Protestant denominations, Calvinism managed to suppress Lutheranism. On 1 April of the next year, Calvinist forces and a rebel group called the Watergeuzen (Sea Beggars)  captured Brielle (Den Briel) and later Vlissingen (Flushing).

In June, Dordrecht and Gorkum fell, and at the latter the rebels captured nine Franciscan priests: Nicholas Pieck, guardian of Gorkum; Hieronymus of Weert, vicar; Theodorus van der Eem of Amersfoort; Nicasius Janssen of Heeze; Willehad of Denmark; Godefried of Mervel; Antonius of Weert; Antonius of Hoornaer, and Franciscus de Roye of Brussels. To these were added two lay brothers from the same friary, Petrus of Assche and Cornelius of Wijk bij Duurstede. At almost the same time the Calvinists arrested the parish priest of Gorkum, Leonardus Vechel of 's-Hertogenbosch, and his assistant.

Also imprisoned were Godefried van Duynsen of Gorkum, a priest in his native city, and Joannes Lenartz of Oisterwijk, a Canon Regular from a nearby priory and spiritual director for the monastery of Augustinian nuns in Gorkum. To these fifteen were later added four more companions: Joannes van Hoornaer (alias known as John of Cologne), a Dominican of the Cologne province and parish priest not far from Gorkum, who when apprised of the incarceration of the clergy of Gorkum hastened to the city in order to administer the sacraments to them and was seized and imprisoned with the rest; Jacobus Lacops of Oudenaar, a Norbertine, who became a curate in Monster, South Holland; Adrianus Janssen of Hilvarenbeek, a Premonstratensian canon and at one time parish priest in Monster, who was sent to Brielle with Jacobus Lacops. Last was  Andreas Wouters of Heynoord.

In prison at Gorkum (from 26 June to 6 July 1572), the first 15 prisoners were transferred to Brielle, arriving there on 8 July. On their way to Dordrecht they were exhibited for money to the curious. The following day, William de la Marck, Lord of Lumey, commander of the Gueux de mer, had them interrogated and ordered a disputation. In the meantime, four others arrived. It was demanded of each that he abandon his belief in the Transubstantiation, the doctrine of the real presence of Christ in the Blessed Sacrament, as well as the belief in the Papal supremacy. All remained firm in their faith. Meanwhile, there came a letter from the Prince of Orange, William the Silent, which enjoined all those in authority to leave priests and religious unmolested. Despite this call, on 9 July, they were hanged in a turfshed.

Veneration
A shrub bearing 19 white flowers is said to have sprung up at the site of their martyrdom. Many miracles have since been attributed to the intercession of the Gorkum Martyrs, especially the curing of hernias. 
The beatification of the martyrs took place on 14 November 1675, and their canonization on 29 June 1867. Their elevation to sainthood, which took place on the Feast of Saints Peter and Paul, was part of grand celebrations marking 1,800 years since the traditional year for the martyrdom of the two apostles in Rome.

For many years the place of their martyrdom in Brielle has been the scene of numerous pilgrimages and processions. The reliquary of their remains is now enshrined in the Church of Saint Nicholas, Brussels, Belgium.

The 19 martyrs
 
 
There were 11 Franciscan friars or Minderbroeders (Friars Minor), one Dominican friar or Predikheer, two Norbertine canons regular and a local canon regular, or witheren and five wereldheren (secular clergy). The 19 put to death on 9 July 1572 were:

 Leonard van Veghel (born 1527), spokesman, secular priest, and since 1566 pastor of Gorkum
 Peter of Assche (born 1530), Franciscan lay brother
 Andrew Wouters (born 1542), secular priest, pastor of Heinenoord in the Hoeksche Waard
 Nicasius of Heeze (born 1522), Franciscan friar, theologian and priest
 Jerome of Weert (born 1522), Franciscan friar, priest, pastor in Gorcum
 Anthony of Hoornaar, Franciscan friar and priest
 Godfried van Duynen (born 1502), secular priest, former pastor in northern France
 Willehad of Denmark (born 1482), Franciscan friar and priest
 James Lacobs (born 1541), Norbertine canon
 Francis of Roye (born 1549), Franciscan friar and priest
 John of Cologne, Dominican friar, pastor in Hoornaar near Gorkum
Anthony of Weert (born 1523), Franciscan friar and priest
 Theodore of der Eem (born c. 1499–1502), Franciscan friar and priest, chaplain to a community of Franciscan Tertiary Sisters in Gorkum
 Cornelius of Wijk bij Duurstede (born 1548), Franciscan lay brother
 Adrian van Hilvarenbeek (born 1528), Norbertine canon and pastor in Monster, South Holland
 Godfried of Mervel, Vicar of Melveren, Sint-Truiden (born 1512), Franciscan priest, vicar of the friary in Gorkum
 Jan of Oisterwijk (born 1504), Augustinian canon regular, a chaplain for the Beguinage in Gorkum
 Nicholas Poppel (born 1532), secular priest, chaplain in Gorkum
 Nicholas Pieck (born 1534), Franciscan friar, priest and theologian, Guardian of the friary in Gorkum, his native city

See also
 Stieltjeskerk
 Martyrs of Alkmaar
 Martyrs of Roermond

References

16th-century births
1572 deaths
Gorkum
Dutch Roman Catholic saints
Eighty Years' War (1566–1609)
History of South Holland
Martyred groups
Deaths by hanging
16th-century Christian saints
Gorkum
Martyred Roman Catholic priests
Franciscan martyrs
Franciscan saints
Premonstratensians
Canonical Augustinian martyrs
Canonical Augustinian saints
Dominican martyrs
Dominican saints
Canonized Roman Catholic religious brothers
Canonizations by Pope Pius IX
1572 in Europe
Gorinchem
Voorne aan Zee
Beatifications by Pope Clement X